Sue Forbes (born July 25, 1961) is an American cross-country skier. She competed in the women's 15 kilometre classical event at the 1992 Winter Olympics.

Cross-country skiing results
All results are sourced from the International Ski Federation (FIS).

Olympic Games

World Cup

Season standings

References

External links
 

1961 births
Living people
American female cross-country skiers
Olympic cross-country skiers of the United States
Cross-country skiers at the 1992 Winter Olympics
Sportspeople from Anchorage, Alaska
21st-century American women